Sir John de Kingston, also known as John de Kyngeston, (died after 1336) was an English knight of the late 12th and early 13th centuries from Somerset.  As one of King Edward I's leading commanders, he was Governor of Edinburgh Castle from 1298 to 1300 and from 1301 to at least 1305 (possibly as late as 1310). John and his brother Nicholas were captured during the battle of Bannockburn on 24 June 1314. He was the Sheriff of Somerset from 1315-1317.

Following Edinburgh Castle's recapture by the English, in 1334 de Kingston was once again given charge of the castle.

He also held the offices of the Sheriff of Edinburgh and Senator of the College of Justice, during part of his lifetime.

References

13th-century births
14th-century deaths
English people of the Wars of Scottish Independence
13th-century English people
14th-century English people